The Department of Mountains was the central governing body of the Mining-metallurgical Okrugs of the Russian Empire. These Okrugs, or "regions", were administrative subdivisions of the Empire relating to mining and mountain industry and the regulation thereof. From 1811 to 1863, it was called the Department of Mountain and Salt Matters. Originally part of the Ministry of Finance, it was transferred to the Ministry of State Property in 1875. The department was disestablished in 1918 with the collapse of the Imperial Russian government.

1918 disestablishments in Russia
Government of the Russian Empire